Angela Nixon is an American politician and community organizer from Jacksonville, Florida who defeated incumbent Kimberly Daniels, who was seeking re-election to the Florida House of Representatives District 14 (part of Duval County), in the Democratic Party primary election. In the heavily-Democratic 14th district, this nomination is tantamount to election. She is currently Director for the Florida Public Service Union's Higher Education Campaign and was previously the Florida State Field Director for the Service Employees International Union, of which FPSU is an affiliate.

Background 
Nixon is a native of Jacksonville and a graduate of Stanton College Preparatory School and the University of Florida. She formerly worked as an aide to Mia L. Jones when Jones was the representative from the 14th district.

In April 2022, Nixon attempted to stage a sit-in demonstration to prevent a vote on Florida's congressional district maps. Opponents of the tactic compared her actions to an insurrection. The demonstration was ultimately unsuccessful.

Community organizer

Melanin Market 
Nixon is the organizer and co-founder of The Melanin Market, which provides small business owners with resources to grow their businesses, provides healthy food options in a food desert and connects residents to resources and services needed to enhance their quality of life.

Health and literacy 
Nixon co-authored a book with her daughter, Natalie McGriff. When Natalie was 7, in response to her low self-esteem about her natural hair, Nixon suggested the two write a comic-style children's book about a girl whose Afro puffs transform her into a powerful superhero. The Adventures of Moxie McGriff was born. The book won Florida's One Spark where they received enough funding to publish and tour the book, donating many copies to organizations that promote literacy.

Nixon, along with her daughter, opened and operate a smoothie/ice cream/sandwich shop on the Eastside of Jacksonville called Natalie’s Nook & Candy Shop. The goal is for their restaurant, is to bring healthy food options to the food insecure neighborhood.

Elections

Since there were no other party nominees for the office, and the two persons who had discussed running as write-in candidates withdrew, the general election was cancelled and Nixon was declared the winner.

References

External links 
Official legislative website
campaign website

Democratic Party members of the Florida House of Representatives
American women trade unionists
Service Employees International Union people
American community activists
African-American trade unionists
Year of birth missing (living people)
Living people
21st-century American politicians
Women state legislators in Florida
21st-century American women politicians
21st-century African-American women
21st-century African-American politicians